"Is It You" is a song by Lee Ritenour from his 1981 LP Rit. Co-written by Ritenour, Bill Champlin, and Eric Tagg who sings lead, it reached number 15 on both the U.S. Billboard Hot 100 and Adult Contemporary charts.  It was also a Top 40 hit in Canada. The music video was featured on MTV's first day of broadcast.

Charts

Cover Versions
Thierry Condor covered the song on his 2013 album Stuff Like That.

References

1981 songs
1981 singles
Elektra Records singles